Helen Vatsikopoulos is an Australian journalist, academic and documentary film-maker. She worked for the Special Broadcasting Service (SBS) and the Australian Broadcasting Corporation (ABC) prior to joining University of Technology, Sydney in September 2011, where she is a lecturer in Journalism and holds a Doctorate in Creative Arts (2019).

Vatsikopoulos hosted the Dateline current affairs program on SBS and hosted the Asia Pacific Focus program on the ABC and the Australia Network.

In 1992, Vatsikopoulos won a Walkley Award for All Media/Best International Report for her body of work on the dissolution of the Soviet Union," for SBS's Dateline.

References 

Australian television presenters
Australian women television presenters
Special Broadcasting Service
Living people
Australian people of Greek descent
Australian broadcast news analysts
Year of birth missing (living people)